Saatchi Shul is an independent Orthodox Jewish synagogue that was founded in Maida Vale, London, in 1998. The synagogue was founded by Charles Saatchi and Maurice Saatchi. When it opened, its rabbi was Pinchas "Pini" Eliezer Dunner.

The Saatchi Shul holds services on the site of the St John's Wood (United) Synagogue, and in 2018 plans were made to merge the two groups.

See also
 List of synagogues in the United Kingdom

References

External links
saatchishul.org
Facebook page

20th-century synagogues
Orthodox Judaism in London
Orthodox synagogues in England
Synagogues in London
St John's Wood